Electric blue may refer to:

 Electric blue (color)

Biology
 Electric blue crayfish (Procambarus alleni)
 Electric blue gecko (Lygodactylus williamsi)
 Sciaenochromis, a genus of haplochromine cichlid fish whose males are electric blue, including:
 Electric blue hap (Sciaenochromis ahli)
 Electric blue kande (Sciaenochromis psammophilu)

Music
 Electric Blue (album), by Andy Bell, or the title song, 2005
 "Electric Blue" (Icehouse song), 1987
 "Electric Blue", a song by Arcade Fire from Everything Now, 2017
 "Electric Blue", a song by the Cranberries from To the Faithful Departed, 1996
 "Electric Blue", a song by Mars & Mystre, 2000
 "Electric Blue", a song by Nicole Scherzinger from Big Fat Lie, 2014

Television
 Electric Blue (TV series), a 1979–1987 British softcore pornography series

See also
 Ionized-air glow
 Electric Blues (disambiguation)